Abu al-Barakat al-Nasafi, was an eminent Hanafi scholar, Qur'an exegete (mufassir), and a Maturidi theologian. He is perhaps best known for his Tafsir Madarik al-Tanzil wa Haqa'iq al-Ta'wil.

He was one of the foremost figures of the classical period of Hanafi jurisprudence and one of the major scholars of the Maturidi school in the Sunni tradition, which developed in parallel with Hanafiyya, who made a tremendous contribution in the field of Islamic sciences in Central Asia, especially to the dissemination of the Hanafian order and teachings of the Maturidi school in the Islamic world and left a great amount of scientific heritage.

He successfully worked in different branches of Islamic studies such as tafsir, fiqh and kalam. For his contribution to Islamic sciences he was given an honorable title of "Hafiz al-Din" (Protector of the Religion).

He was praised by 'Abd al-Hayy al-Lucknawi, and Ibn Hajar al-'Asqalani described him as the "'Allamah of the World", and Ibn Taghribirdi gave him the honorable title of "Shaykh al-Islam".

Some scholars ranked him as mujtahid in Hanafi fiqh.

Name 
Abu al-Barakat 'Abd Allah b. Ahmad b. Mahmud Hafiz al-Din al-Nasafi (an ascription to the city of Nasaf in Transoxania, modern Qarshi in southern Uzbekistan).

Birth 

His birth date is unknown, but he was born in Izaj. It was also said that he was born in Nasaf in Sogdiana (present-day Southern Uzbekistan and Western Tajikistan).

Teachers 
He studied under some teachers and masters, such as:
 Shams al-A'imma Abu al-Wajd Muhammad b. 'Abd al-Sattar b. Muhammad al'Imādi al-Kardari (d. 642 AH).
 Hamid al-Din 'Ali b. Muhammad b. 'Ali al-Darir al-Ramushi al-Bukhari (d. 666 AH).
 Badr al-Din Jawahir-Zadah Muhammad b. Mahmud b. 'Abdelkarim (d. 651 AH).

Students 
His pupils were:
 Muzaffar al-Din ibn al-Sa'ati, author of the Majma' al-Bahrain wa Multaqa al-Nayyirain (d. 694/1294 — 1295).
 Husam al-Din Husayn b. 'Ali al-Sighnaqi, a commentator on the al-Hidaya (d. 714/1314 — 1315).

Books 
Some of his most celebrated works are:
 Madarik al-Tanzil wa Haqa'iq al-Ta'wil.
 Kanz al-Daqa'iq is a summary of Islamic legal prescriptions according to the Hanifite school of sharia law.
 Manar al-Anwar fi Usul al-Fiqh.
  'Umdat al-Aqa'id. A treatise on kalam (Islamic theology), expounding Sunni dogmas, with a refutation of the doctrines of the Shi'a and other sects. The work was edited by the English orientalist William Cureton and published in London in 1843, under the title of 'Umdat 'Aqidat Ahl al-Sunnah wa al-Jama'ah he also wrote comments to this book and called it Al-I'timad.
 Al-Musaffa fi Sharh al-Manzuma al-Nasafiyya fi al-Khilafiyyat. A commentary work on Abu Hafs 'Umar al-Nasafi's al-Manzumah fi al-Khilafiyyat which is a book on controversions and differences between law schools.

Death 
He died in 710/1310 in Baghdad on a Friday evening of the month Rabi' al-Awwal. He was buried in the city of Izaj located between Khuzestan and Isfahan. According to Kurashi and Ibn Taghribirdi, his date of death was 701 AH = 1301 AD.

See also 
 Abu al-Mu'in al-Nasafi
 Najm al-Din 'Umar al-Nasafi
 Burhan al-Din al-Marghinani
 List of Hanafis
 List of Ash'aris and Maturidis
 List of Muslim theologians

References 

Hanafi fiqh scholars
Maturidis
14th-century Muslim theologians
Quranic exegesis scholars
Shaykh al-Islāms
Sunni imams
Sunni fiqh scholars
Sunni Muslim scholars of Islam
People from Izeh
1310 deaths
1301 deaths